Anastacia (born 1968, as Anastacia Lyn Newkirk) is an American entertainer.

Anastacia may also refer to:
 Anastacia (given name), a female given name
 Anastacia (album), 2004 album by Anastacia Lyn Newkirk
 Anastácia, a Mulher sem Destino (TV series; aka Anastácia), a 1967 Brazilian telenovela

See also

 
 Anastasia (disambiguation)